The 1997 U.S. Women's Hard Court Championships was a women's tennis tournament played on outdoor hard courts at the Stone Mountain Tennis Center in Atlanta, Georgia in the United States that was part of Tier II of the 1997 WTA Tour. It was the 30th edition of the tournament and was held from August 18 through August 24, 1997. Lindsay Davenport won the singles title.

Finals

Singles

 Lindsay Davenport defeated  Sandrine Testud 6–4, 6–1
 It was Davenport's 9th title of the year and the 27th of her career.

Doubles

 Nicole Arendt /  Manon Bollegraf defeated  Alexandra Fusai /  Nathalie Tauziat 6–7, 6–3, 6–2
 It was Arendt's 4th title of the year and the 13th of her career. It was Bollegraf's 5th title of the year and the 28th of her career.

External links
 ITF tournament edition details
 Tournament draws

U.S. Women's Hard Court Championships
Connecticut Open (tennis)
U.S. Women's Hard Court Championships
U.S. Women's Hard Court Championships
U.S. Women's Hard Court Championships